Events in the year 1659 in Norway.

Incumbents
Monarch: Frederick III

Events
February - The Second Battle of Frederikshald.

Arts and literature

Births

5 June – Anne Clausdatter, businesswoman and owner of Borgestad Manor in Skien (died 1713)

Deaths

7 November – Jens Bjelke, nobleman, Chancellor of Norway (b.1580).

See also

References